Balagan Limited is a Russian music group that came into being in May 1996 in the city of Rybinsk. On 1 June 1999 'Balagan Limited' already appears in the new composition: Svetlana Smirnova, Elena Selihova, Alyona Morugina and Dmitry Filin. There is also a fifth member in  'Balagan Limited'  group, Ulyan Koval, who in 1999 had a car accident and still can not go on stage.

Group participated in the Slavianski Bazaar in Vitebsk, Pesnya goda, ZD Awards.

'Balagan Limited'  has songs in its repertoire in English, Ukrainian, Georgian, Latvian, Bulgarian and Hebrew. The group has representatives in Ukraine, Israel and Latvia.

Awards 
  Chanson of the Year (2002) 
 Nasha Pisnya (Ukraine)
 Favorite of Olympus   2004 (Ukraine) for the promotion of Ukrainian culture in Russia

References

External links 
 

Musical groups established in 1999
Russian folk music groups
Russian pop music groups
Pop-folk music groups
1999 establishments in Russia